HD 176527 is a single star in the northern constellation of Lyra, positioned near the southern constellation border with Vulpecula. It has an orange hue and is dimly visible to the naked eye with an apparent visual magnitude of 5.26. This object is located at a distance of approximately 266 light years from the Sun based on parallax, and it has an absolute magnitude of 0.28. It is drifting closer with a radial velocity of −22.6 km/s.

This is an aging giant star with a stellar classification of K2III, which indicates it has exhausted the supply of hydrogen at its core, then evolved away from the main sequence by cooling and expanding. At present it has 20 times the radius of the Sun. The star is radiating 128 times the luminosity of the Sun from its swollen photosphere at an effective temperature of 4,325 K.

References

K-type giants
Lyra (constellation)
Durchmusterung objects
176527
093256
7181